This article shows the rosters of all participating teams at the 2017 FIBA Under-19 Women's Basketball World Cup in Italy.

Group A

China

Italy

Mali

United States

Group B

Egypt

Puerto Rico

Russia

Spain

Group C

Canada

France

Latvia

South Korea

Group D

Australia

Hungary

Japan

Mexico

References

External links
Official website

2017
Basketball squads